"You're in My Head" is a song recorded by American country music artist Brian McComas.  It was released in October 2003 as the second single from the album Brian McComas.  The song reached #21 on the Billboard Hot Country Singles & Tracks chart.  The song was written by Jeffrey Steele, Shane Minor and Chris Wallin.

Chart performance

References

2003 singles
2003 songs
Brian McComas songs
Songs written by Shane Minor
Songs written by Jeffrey Steele
Songs written by Chris Wallin
Lyric Street Records singles